I Knew You When may refer to:

 "I Knew You When" (song), a song by Billy Joe Royal
 I Knew You When (album), a 2017 album by Bob Seger